Nawur, is the largest district in Afghanistan's Ghazni province by area. Its population, which is entirely Hazara, was estimated at 91,778 (more than half of whom were children under 12) in 2002. The Jikhai River originates here.
Nawur with 5234 square kilometre is located in northern part of Ghazni Province, Nawur is neighbour with  Qarabagh District in south, Jaghuri District, Malistan District and Ajristan District (Daya) in south west, Jaghatu District and Rashidan District in east, Miramor District of Daikundi province in west, Waras District of Bamian Province in north west, Behsud District, Daimirdad District and Jeghatu District of Maidan Wardak Province in north.

Agriculture

Main crops include wheat and barley.  Animal husbandry includes sheep, goats, cows, poultry and horses.

In 2011, Polish members of the Provincial Reconstruction Team (PRT) along with local residents constructed a dam and new passage in Tal Bulagh valley. Supplies of water gathered will allow to irrigate crop fields.

Geography

External links
 Map of Settlements AIMS, May 2002

See also
Districts of Afghanistan
Ghazni Province

References

Districts of Ghazni Province
Hazarajat